Spanduni was a district of Armenia  400–800 and the name of the family that ruled it.

See also
List of regions of ancient Armenia

Early medieval Armenian regions